In November 2020, voters in the U.S. state of Oregon passed Ballot Measure 110, "[reclassifying] possession/penalties for specified drugs". Drugs affected include heroin, methamphetamine, PCP, LSD and oxycodone, as well as others. The Drug Policy Alliance non-profit organization was behind the measure.  Reclassifies penalty for drug possession as a Class E civil violation. The new law aims to reverse racial disparities in policing, and was projected to reduce black arrests by 94%. 

The new law came into effect on February 1, 2021.

See also 
 List of Oregon ballot measures
 Drug policy of Oregon

References 

2020 Oregon ballot measures
Controlled substances in Oregon
Criminal justice reform in the United States
Drug policy reform
Health policy in the United States
Public health in the United States
Criminal penalty ballot measures in the United States